National Highway 848, commonly called NH 848 is a national highway in  India. It is a spur road of National Highway 48. NH-848 traverses the states of Maharashtra and Gujarat in India.

Route 

 Maharashtra

Thane - Nashik - Peint - Gujarat border.

 Gujarat

Maharashtra border - Kaprada - Pardi.

Junctions  

  Terminal near Thane.
  Terminal near Pardi.

Upgradation 
The MORTH granted Rs 39 crore for widening of 15 km stretch of the Nashik-Peth-Gujarat border of NH848 in 2014.

See also 

 List of National Highways in India
 List of National Highways in India by state

References

External links 

 NH 848 on OpenStreetMap

National highways in India
National Highways in Maharashtra
National Highways in Gujarat
Transport in Thane